The Getty Conservation Institute (GCI), located in Los Angeles, California, is a program of the J. Paul Getty Trust. It is headquartered at the Getty Center but also has facilities at the Getty Villa, and commenced operation in 1985. The GCI is a private international research institution dedicated to advancing conservation practice through the creation and delivery of knowledge. It "serves the conservation community through scientific research, education and training, model field projects, and the dissemination of the results of both its own work and the work of others in the field" and "adheres to the principles that guide the work of the Getty Trust: service, philanthropy, teaching, and access." GCI has activities in both art conservation and architectural conservation.

GCI conducts scientific research related to art conservation. It offers formal education and training programs, and it has published a number of scholarly books.  GCI has supported field projects around the world to preserve cultural heritage.

Scientific projects 
GCI scientists study the deterioration of objects and buildings, and how to prevent or stop such deterioration.  One of many projects in this area involved the effect of outdoor and indoor air pollutants on museum collections.  Another project analyzed the cause of deterioration of the sandstone in the original National Capitol Columns now at the United States National Arboretum.

In addition, GCI "conducts scientific research on materials' composition." For example, a project on the conservation of photographs has as one of its objectives the creation of an "Atlas of Analytical Signatures of Photographic Processes" which will provide "a precise chemical fingerprint of all the 150 or so ways pictures have been developed." As a part of that project, Getty scientists once examined the world's first photograph from nature by Nicéphore Niépce. Using X-ray fluorescence spectroscopy, reflectance Fourier transform infrared spectroscopy, and other techniques during the 2002-2003 project, they found (for example) that bitumen of Judea was present in the image.

Scientists at GCI viewed the CheMin instrument aboard the Curiosity rover, currently exploring the Gale crater on Mars, as a potentially valuable means to examine ancient works of art without damaging them. Until recently, only a few instruments were available to determine the composition without cutting out physical samples large enough to potentially damage the artifacts. The CheMin on Curiosity directs a beam of X-rays at particles as small as 400 µm and reads the radiation scattered back to determine the composition of an object in minutes. Engineers created a smaller, portable version, named the X-Duetto. Fitting into a few briefcase-sized boxes, it can examine objects on site, while preserving their physical integrity. It is now being used by Getty scientists to analyze a large collection of museum antiques and the Roman ruins of Herculaneum, Italy.

Education and training 
Training of interested parties around the world is important for the sustainability of GCI's work. For example, GCI collaborated with other organizations to create a course "to assist museum personnel in safeguarding their collections from the effects of natural and human-made emergencies." Also, GCI developed a course on the "Fundamentals of the Conservation of Photographs" which is now taught in eastern Europe by the Academy of Fine Arts and Design in Bratislava and the Slovak National Library.  Besides courses and workshops, GCI has also been involved with long-term education programs, such as establishing a Master's degree program in Archaeological and Ethnographic Conservation in collaboration with the University of California, Los Angeles.

Field projects 
GCI's field projects are "selected based on how they fit the institute's goals of raising public awareness, contributing new, broadly applicable information to the field, and supporting cultural heritage" and "must be executed in collaboration with partners… who must be serious about their efforts… so that projects are assured of continuing after the Getty's involvement ceases." Among other completed GCI field projects were efforts to preserve the Mogao Caves and Yungang Grottoes in China (announced in 1989); to restore prehistoric rock paintings of Sierra de San Francisco in Baja California Sur (1994); and to protect ancient buildings and archaeological sites in Iraq following the start of the Iraq War (2004).

Dissemination of information 
It has been stated that "perhaps the institute's most profound contribution to conservation is the dissemination of information and methods learned in the field." Methods of information dissemination include conferences; lectures; books; and online publications, newsletters, video, and audio.

The following are selected books published by GCI:
 Ward, Philip R. The nature of conservation: a race against time. Marina del Rey, CA: Getty Conservation Institute, 1986. 
 The conservation of tapestries and embroideries: proceedings of meetings at the Institut royal du patrimoine artistique, Brussels, Belgium, September 21–24, 1987. Los Angeles: Getty Conservation Institute, 1989. 
 Cather, Sharon.  The conservation of wall paintings: proceedings of a symposium organized by the Courtauld Institute of Art and the Getty Conservation Institute, London, July 13–16, 1987. Marina del Rey, CA: Getty Conservation Institute, 1991. 
 Beley, Ennis, and Jeffrey Levin. Picture LA: landmarks of a new generation. Marina del Rey, CA: Getty Conservation Institute, 1994. 
 Klein, Kathryn. The unbroken thread: conserving the textile traditions of Oaxaca. Los Angeles: Getty Conservation Institute, 1997. 
 Corzo, Miguel Angel. Mortality immortality?: the legacy of 20th-century art. Los Angeles: Getty Conservation Institute, 1999. 
 Dorge, Valerie, and Sharon L. Jones. Building an emergency plan: a guide for museums and other cultural institutions. Los Angeles: Getty Conservation Institute, 1999.  Lavédrine, Bertrand, Jean-Paul Gandolfo, and Sibylle Monod. A guide to the preventive conservation of photograph collections. Los Angeles: Getty Conservation Institute, 2003. 
 Schweidler, Max, and Roy L Perkinson. The restoration of engravings, drawings, books, and other works on paper. Los Angeles: Getty Conservation Institute, 2006. 
 Rainer, Leslie and Angelyn Bass Rivera editors. The Conservation of Decorated Surfaces on Earthen Architecture. Los Angeles: Getty Conservation Institute, 2006. 
 Caneva, Giulia, Maria Pia Nugari, and Ornella Salvadori. Plant Biology for Cultural Heritage: Biodeterioration and Conservation''. Los Angeles: Getty Conservation Institute, 2009. 

Here is a selection of courses by GCI:
ARIS (International Course on Architectural Records, Inventories and Information Systems for Conservation)

Senior staff

Since GCI was established, it has had three directors. Besides the director, the GCI senior staff includes:
 Associate Director, Programs: Jeanne Marie Teutonico
 Associate Director, Administration: Kathleen Gaines
 Head of Science: Tom Learner
 Head of Education: Kathleen Dardes
 Head of Field Projects: Susan Macdonald
In 2009, GCI had a $33 million budget, down from $41 million in 2008.

Getty conservation activities outside GCI 
In addition to the work of the GCI, the J. Paul Getty Trust contributes to the conservation field through the J. Paul Getty Museum conservation departments, the conservation collection located in the library at the Getty Research Institute, and conservation grants provided by the Getty Foundation.

References

External links
 
RecorDIM project records, 1994-2007, finding aid for archival material containing the administrative history of the Getty Conservation Institute, Getty Research Institute. Accession No. IA10016.

J. Paul Getty Trust
Conservation and restoration of cultural heritage
Historic preservation organizations in the United States
Arts organizations based in California
Art in Greater Los Angeles
Organizations based in Los Angeles
Arts organizations established in 1985
1985 establishments in California